Massoud Hamid is a Kurdish Syrian journalism student. He took photographs of a pro-Kurdish event.

Biography
Hamid received a three-year prison sentence. Hamid was held in solitary confinement in Adra Prison for one year from 2003–04 before he was allowed monthly visits, and Human Rights Watch said that interrogators reportedly tortured him and beat him with a studded whip on the bottom of his feet.

He received the 2005 cyberfreedom prize from Reporters Without Borders.

References

Living people
Syrian journalists
Syrian prisoners and detainees
Prisoners and detainees of Syria
Syrian torture victims
Year of birth missing (living people)